"My Girl" is a song by Swedish pop boyband The Fooo Conspiracy. The song was released as a digital download in Sweden on 29 January 2016 through Artist House Stockholm. The song has peaked at number 58 on the Swedish Singles Chart. The single was re-released on 17 June 2016 featuring vocals from Danny Saucedo.

Music video
A video to accompany the release of "My Girl" was first released onto YouTube on 30 January 2016 at a total length of three minutes and eleven seconds. A second music video for the song was released onto YouTube on 30 January 2016.

Track listing

Chart performance

Weekly charts

Release history

References

2016 singles
2016 songs
Songs written by Erik Hassle
FO&O songs